Hannah is a city in Cavalier County, North Dakota, United States. The population was 8 at the 2020 census. Hannah was founded in 1897.

Geography
Hannah is located at  (48.973119, -98.690639).

Demographics

2010 census
As of the census of 2010, there were 15 people, 7 households, and 2 families living in the city. The racial makeup of the city was 100.0% White.

There were 7 households, of which 28.6% had children under the age of 18 living with them, 14.3% were married couples living together, 14.3% had a male householder with no wife present, and 71.4% were non-families. 71.4% of all households were made up of individuals, and 42.9% had someone living alone who was 65 years of age or older. The average household size was 2.14 and the average family size was 5.00.

The median age in the city was 29.5 years. 33.3% of residents were under the age of 18; 13.4% were between the ages of 18 and 24; 6.7% were from 25 to 44; 26.6% were from 45 to 64; and 20% were 65 years of age or older. The gender makeup of the city was 53.3% male and 46.7% female. The per capita income for the city was $17,562. There were no families and 19.2% of the population living below the poverty line, including no under eighteens and 41.7% of those over 64.

2000 census
As of the census of 2000, there were 20 people, 13 households, and 5 families living in the city. The population density was 103.5 people per square mile (40.6/km2). There were 24 housing units at an average density of 124.2 per square mile (48.8/km2). 100% of residents were White.

There were 13 households, out of which one had children under the age of 18 living with them, five were married couples living together, and eight were non-families. Eight households were made up of individuals, and five had someone living alone who was 65 years of age or older. The average household size was 1.54 and the average family size was 2.40.

In the city, the population was spread out, with one person (a girl) under the age of 18, four from 25 to 44, six from 45 to 64, and nine who were 65 years of age or older. The median age was 64 years. There were nine females and eleven males.

Economy

In 2020, the total value of products produced in Hannah, North Dakota was $2.92 million.

Notable people

 Dorothy Adams, actress, mother of Rachel Ames
 Ethel Catherwood, Canadian track and field athlete

Climate
This climatic region is typified by large seasonal temperature differences, with warm to hot (and often humid) summers and cold (sometimes severely cold) winters.  According to the Köppen Climate Classification system, Hannah has a humid continental climate, abbreviated "Dfb" on climate maps.

See also
 Hannah–Snowflake Border Crossing

References

Cities in Cavalier County, North Dakota
Cities in North Dakota
Populated places established in 1897
1897 establishments in North Dakota